São Miguel dos Campos-AL is a municipality located in the eastern half of the Brazilian state of Alagoas. Its population was 61,797 as of 2020 estimates and its area is 361 km².

References

Municipalities in Alagoas